Josef Erich von Stroheim (1922–2002) was an American sound editor. His father was director Erich von Stroheim.

Early life 
Stroheim was born in Los Angeles on September 18, 1922 and grew up in Beverly Hills, California. He began his career as a still photographer for Metro-Goldwyn-Mayer's publicity department in 1939. He enlisted into the United States Army in 1942 to fight in World War II and served as a combat photographer in Europe and Japan, where one of his subjects was Hideki Tojo.

Career 
After the war he was a member of the International Combat Camera Association and worked as a sound editor. He won two Emmy Awards for sound editing for QB VII (1977) and The Immortal (1970) as well as five Motion Picture Sound Editors Golden Reel Awards.

Later life and death 
Stroheim retired in 1988 and died in Van Nuys from complications from lung cancer on March 22, 2002. He is buried in an unmarked grave Valhalla Memorial Park Cemetery.

References

External links 
 
 https://filmtalk.org/2017/12/15/josef-von-stroheim-my-father-erich-von-stroheim-only-pretended-to-be-very-difficult-to-handle/

1922 births
2002 deaths
People from Los Angeles
American sound editors
Burials at Valhalla Memorial Park Cemetery
Deaths from lung cancer in California
United States Army personnel of World War II